Cross-cultural competence refers to the knowledge, skills, and affect/motivation that enable individuals to adapt effectively in cross-cultural environments. Cross-cultural competence is defined here as an individual capability that contributes to intercultural effectiveness regardless of the particular intersection of cultures. The concept may overlap to that of so-called cultural agility. Although some aspects of cognition, behavior, or affect may be particularly relevant in a specific country or region, evidence suggests that a core set of competencies enables adaptation to any culture (Hammer, 1987).

Cross-cultural competence is not an end in itself, but is a set of variables that contribute to intercultural effectiveness. Whereas previous models have tended to emphasize subjective outcomes, by focusing primarily on adjustment, outcomes of interest here include both subjective and objective outcomes. Objective outcomes, such as job performance, have been addressed
in previous research, but to a lesser degree than the subjective outcomes. Research indicates that the outcomes are linked, with personal and interpersonal adjustment linked to work adjustment, which has in turn been linked with job performance (Shay & Baack, 2006). However, these relationships are small, and some research has demonstrated that subjective outcomes can diverge from objective outcomes (Kealey, 1989), with expatriates sometimes showing relatively poor adjustment but high
effectiveness in their organizational role.

See also
 Intercultural competence
 Transcultural Psychiatry
 Acculturation

References

 Text of this article has been taken from a US Army document, with a claim the source is public domain.

Cultural concepts
Cultural competence